Yesterday's Dreams is an album by American jazz guitarist Alphonso Johnson that was released in 1976 by Epic Records. The album reached No. 28 on the Billboard magazine Jazz Albums chart.

Overview
Yesterday's Dreams was executively produced by Jerry Schoenbaum. Artists such as Grover Washington Jr., Sheila E., Philip Bailey, Flora Purim, Dianne Reeves, Lee Ritenour and Patrice Rushen also appeared upon the album.

Critical reception

Allmusic gave the album a three out of five stars rating.

Track listing

Personnel
 Alphonso Johnson – guitar, bass guitar, Chapman Stick, vocals
 Chuck Findley – trumpet
 Gary Grant – trumpet, flugelhorn
 George Bohanon – trombone
 Garnett Brown – trombone
 Grover Washington Jr. – tenor saxophone
 Ernie Watts – tenor saxophone
 Ernie Fields – baritone saxophone, flute
 Mark Jordan – organ
 David Foster – organ
 Patrice Rushen – electric piano, clavinet, harpsichord
 Ian Underwood – synthesizer
 Ray Gomez – guitar
 Lee Ritenour – guitar
 Mike Clark – drums
 Chester Thompson – drums
 Sheila Escovedo – percussion
 Ruth Underwood – percussion
 Philip Bailey – vocals
 Jon Lucien – vocals
 Dianne Reeves – vocals
Technical
Bruce Heigh - assistant producer
Jerry Schoenbaum - executive producer
Don Murray - engineer
Tommy Vicari - remixing engineer
Ken Anderson, Ron Coro - design
Bill Imhoff - cover illustration

References

1976 albums
Epic Records albums